C. arvensis may refer to:

 Calendula arvensis, the field marigold, a flowering plant species
 Coleosporium sonchi-arvensis, a synonym for Coleosporium tussilaginis 
 Convolvulus arvensis, the field bindweed, a bindweed species native to Europe and Asia

See also
 Arvensis (disambiguation)